Smiffys is a UK wholesale, fancy dress manufacturer specialising in party fashion, leisure and entertainment products.

Founded in 1894 by Robert Henry Smith, Smiffys began as a wigmakers, and today is part of the R H Smith & Sons (Wig Makers Ltd) group. As a fancy dress, halloween, carnival and World Book Day manufacturing company in the UK, the company distributes nearly 5,000 products to over 1,700 stockists around the world with over 26 million items shipped every year.

The company head office is in Gainsborough, Lincolnshire, and their creative services team is based in Central Park Leeds, where products are designed and created.  However, in October 2016, in the wake of the Brexit Referendum, the company's director, Elliott Peckett, announced that it would open a new headquarters in the Netherlands to safeguard access to its markets and talent pools.

The company supplies dressing up costumes, wigs and accessories under the brands Smiffys and Fever, and currently employs 250 people. R H Smith & Sons brands include the Time4Fun range of children's toy and leisure items, Fever, a lingerie collection, and Smiffys.

Awards 

Smiffys Won Best Licensed Dress Up at The Licensing Awards 2018, and again in 2019
Smiffys awarded 2017 Platinum Vendor Award with Claire's
Smiffys Won Gainsborough Business of the Year for the fourth time in 2015
In 2014, Smiffys win Family Business of the Year
Smiffys ranked 115th in the 2013 The Sunday Times International Track 200
Smiffys won Best Licensed Dress up or Partyware Range at the Licensing Awards
Smiffy won 2012, 2014Gainsborough Business of the Year award
At the 2011 Licensing Awards, Smiffys won the Best Licensed Dress up or Partyware Range award with their Sesame Street costume
Smiffys were nominated as a finalist for the Best Licensed Dress up or Partyware Range at The Licensing Awards 2012
In 2010, Smiffys won Gainsborough Business of the Year Award
In 2003, 2004 and 2005 Smiffys won the Best Costume Manufacturer at the Party Industry Awards
In 2000 and again in 2002 Smiffys won Best Costume Accessories Supplier/Manufacturer at the Party Industry Awards
Smiffys won the Best Costume Accessories Supplier/Manufacturer at the Party Times Awards in 1999

Sponsorship and charity 

 Since 2012 Smiffys have been partnered with SOS Children's Villages
 Smiffys were the official Fancy Dress sponsor at "T in The Park" 2012
 In 2012 teamed up with TOWIE to create a ‘Best of British’ range
From 2011-2012, Smiffy's were partnered with Make A Wish Foundation
 Smiffys were the main sponsor at the 2012 Gainsborough Best in Schools Awards
 Smiffys supplied the British 2012 Olympic Rowing Team with outfits

References

External links 
UK Retail Website
Australian Retail Website

Companies based in Lincolnshire